Rekhta is an Indian literary web portal owned by the Rekhta Foundation, a nonprofit and non-governmental organization dedicated to the promotion of the Urdu literature in South Asia. It has digitalized about ninety thousand books during the period of six years since it began publishing Urdu, Hindi and Persian literature, containing biographies of poets, Urdu poetry, fiction and nonfiction writings that originally belongs to public and research libraries in the Indian subcontinent. It serves content in multiple scripts such as Devanagari, Roman and, primarily, Nastaliq. It also includes religious texts, including the Quran and the Mahabharata, a Sanskrit epic of ancient India. It hosts books from centuries earlier and is recognized the largest web portal in the world for the preservation of Urdu literature.

The site has digitalized more than 90,000 e-books with nineteen million pages, which are categorically classified into different sections such as diaries, children's literature, poetries, banned books, and translations, involving Urdu poetry. It is also credited for preserving 4,455 biographies of poets (worldwide), 41,017 ghazals, 26,414 couplets, 7,852 nazms, 6,836 literary videos, 2,127 audio files, 76,398 e-books manuscripts and pop magazines.

History  
Rekhta was founded in January, 2013 in Nagpur, India. The portal came into existence after the idea of "Urdu virtual library" was introduced by Sanjiv Saraf to professors at the university. The literary works, including Urdu poetry were collected from the different private and public libraries across the major cities of India such as Lucknow, Bhopal, Hyderabad, Aligarh, including India's capital Delhi.

Literature promotion

Rekhta Live 
Following the COVID-19 pandemic lockdowns, it launched an "online mehfil" (live seasons) of literature, music and poetry across its social channels via third-party software component. It was attended by the people across the five continents, leading the website to receive over two million views.

Festivals 

The Foundation celebrates various literary festivals, including Jashn-e-Rekhta, in which people from different walks are invited to participate in literary works such as Urdu poetry, music, short stories. It also engage the literary figures in direct conversations to promote Hindustani language along with the Urdu literature. The two day event is organized every year at Delhi.

Shaam-e-Sher 
The Foundation has also begun organising mushairas, a literary event called Shaam-e-Sher (poetry in the evening). It is generally attended by the young adult poets aged between eighteen to thirty. It was primarily adopted to promote Urdu literature where ghazals and nazms are recited by the event attendees.

Aamozish 

Launched by the Foundation in 2017, Aamozish is an e-learning initiative that seeks to promote the Urdu script.

Sufinama 

Sufinama is a Rekhta Foundation initiative that preserves and propagates 400 years of Sufi writing and philosophy. It also provides the largest online collection of Hazrat Amir Khusrau’s work and the translations of his Persian ghazals.

Hindwi 

The Foundation also launched Hindwi, a website dedicated to Hindi literature, in July 2020.

Controversies 
The organization made changes in the Jashn-e-Rekhta event by replacing Urdu with the Hindustani language, although the organization was established for the promotion of Urdu literature through its portal. On 13 December 2019, it made official announcement during its sixth edition of the mehfil held at Major Dhyan Chand National Stadium. The posters, which were received by the event speakers mentioned "Jashn-e-Rekhta: The Biggest Celebration of Hindustani Language and Culture" (not mentioning "Urdu" word). Later, the Urdu speakers criticised the changes citing "It seems Jashn-e-Rekhta has surrendered to the powers that be". An Indian writer and journalist Ziya Us Salam called the changes unfavorable and linked it to the Delhi High Court's decision after it ordered the police "to cut down on “difficult” words in Urdu". An Indian poet Gauhar Raza subsequently called the changes "unfortunate" and "problematic".

References

External links
 
Rekhta Foundation

Literary translation websites
Web portals
2013 establishments in India
Arts organisations based in Delhi
Indian digital libraries
Indian literature websites
Indian educational websites
Indian online encyclopedias
Non-profit organisations based in India
Cultural promotion organizations
Urdu-language websites
Urdu-language computing
Urdu-language literature